This is a list of public art in the London Borough of Camden.

Bloomsbury

Camden Town

Covent Garden

Euston Road

Regent's Place

Fitzrovia

Gospel Oak

Hampstead

Hampstead Heath

Highgate
Highgate is partly located outside the borough of Camden; for works not listed here see the relevant sections for the boroughs of Haringey and Islington.

Kentish Town

Holborn

Regent's Park 
Part of Regent's Park lies outside the borough of Camden; for works not listed here see the list of public art in St Marylebone.
Regent's Park is one of London's Royal Parks, located partly in the London Borough of Camden and partly in the City of Westminster.

Somers Town

Swiss Cottage

West Hampstead

References

Bibliography

External links
 

Buildings and structures in the London Borough of Camden
Camden
Tourist attractions in the London Borough of Camden